The Bibliothèque universitaire des langues et civilisations (BULAC) is a major academic library located in Paris Rive Gauche and which has been open to the public since its 2011 opening. The library has a scope that includes  all languages and civilisations that are not those of the Western World. It provides more than one million documents written in all languages,  formed from the former collections of more than 20 libraries.

Building 

The construction of the building began in summer 2008. The architect is Yves Lion. The library has five floors within the building, the public space is on three floors with 910 seats.

The building is under the responsibility of the region Île-de-France which also provided two-thirds of the financing, the French State provided the rest. The financing was about 80 million euros.

The operating cost is about 2.5 million euros per year.

Status 

The BULAC is legally a  made of the following institutions:
The French State;
Institut national des langues et civilisations orientales (Inalco);
École pratique des hautes études (EPHE);
School for Advanced Studies in the Social Sciences (in French: École des hautes études en sciences sociales, or EHESS);
École française d'Extrême-Orient;
Pantheon-Sorbonne University;
University of Paris III: Sorbonne Nouvelle;
Paris-Sorbonne University (which became Sorbonne Université in 2018);
Paris Diderot University (which became Université Paris-Cité in 2022);
centre national de la recherche scientifique (CNRS).

The BULAC is administrated by a general assembly where the ministry has four representatives (two interested in higher education, two interested in research). The other preceding institutions have one representative each. A scientific council or conseil scientifique made of French and foreign professors and researchers defines the general Collection Management Policy.

 Direction

BULAC direction is made of a director, a vice-director and a scientific director.
 Director: Marie-Lise Tsagouria
 Vice-director: Jean-François Chanal
 Scientific director: Benjamin Guichard who took over from Francis Richard in 2015

Collections 

The collections of the library include 1.5 million volumes which cover 350 languages in 80 alphabets.

Libraries incorporated 

BULAC gathers the former collections of about twenty different libraries of specific interest. The main of these libraries is the Bibliothèque interuniversitaire des langues orientales (formerly the bibliothèque de l'École des langues orientales), which was located until 2011 on four different sites, including Inalco.

The other libraries incorporated into the BULAC are:

the Slavic collection of the Bibliothèque inter-universitaire de la Sorbonne
from the université Paris III:
the bibliothèque James-Darmesteter of the Institut d'études iraniennes
the bibliothèque Jules-Bloch
the Finnish and Turkish Ottoman collections of the Common service of documentation (in French: Service commun de documentation, or SCD) of Paris III
part of the collections of the library of the Centre d'études slaves (Sorbonne Université)
part of the collections of the UFR Langues et civilisations de l'Asie orientale (Université Paris Cité)
part of the collections of the library of the École française d'Extrême-Orient
part of the collections of the six libraries of the École des hautes études en sciences sociales (EHESS):
library of the Centre de recherches sur le Japon
library of the Centre d’études sur la Chine moderne et contemporaine
library of the Centre d’études sur l’Inde et l’Asie du Sud
library of the Centre de recherches sur la Corée
library of the Centre d´études africaines
library of the Centre d´étude des mondes russe, caucasien et centre-européen
the indianist collections of the central library of the history and philology section of the École pratique des hautes études (EPHE)

Documents 

Special attention was put on open access collections, which include 225 000 documents (books and journals), in French, in English, and above all in the non-Western languages which are the core interest of the library.

Library catalogue 
The catalogue of the BULAC, performed with Koha, inventories all the books of the library, excepting part of the books written in non-Latin characters which were obtained before 2000. The documents in languages of non-Latin writing may be described:
 in original characters, following the written form of the language and the meaning of the writing.
 in transliteration or transcription of the non-Latin writings: each Arabic, Chinese, Greek, Thai character,... is transcribed by a Latin character (transliteration), or by its phonetic transposition (transcription).

In 2019, the catalogue was enhanced with a discovery system (EBSCO Discovery System) to allow access to online resources (articles, journals and e-books, etc.) and to digitized heritage collections through a same research field.

The BiNA : Digitized heritage collections 
The BiNA (Bibliothèque Numérique Aréale or Regional Digital Library), performed with Omeka, gives access to all the copyright-free documents digitized by the library: heritage collections from all over the world selected among the most valuable ones of the library (old prints, manuscripts, etchings, journals...). All of these documents are accessible and downloadable on the BiNA website.

The digitized documents are divided up into ten collections, according to their geographical origin and/or their language:
 Asia
 Turkish area
 Middle East, the Maghreb, Central Asia
 Persian area
 Arabic area
 Naxi manuscripts
 Chinese area
 Turkish Ottoman manuscripts
 Persian manuscripts
 Arabic manuscripts

Le Carreau de la BULAC 
BULAC librarians also created and lead, since 2013, Le Carreau de la BULAC, a research blog on the Hypothèses.org platform. This blog offers to students and scholars interested in languages and non-Western civilizations news and informations on the collections of the library and on area studies.

La Croisée de la BULAC 
In addition, La Croisée de la BULAC inventories the last publications from a selection of research blogs with interest on Africa, Asia, Central and Eastern Europe, Middle East and the Muslim world, as well as on indigenous cultures of the Pacifics and America.

References

External links
 Official website 
 Catalog 

Academic libraries in France
Libraries established in 2011
2011 establishments in France
Libraries in Paris
Buildings and structures in the 13th arrondissement of Paris
Ethnic libraries